Komoshtitsa is a village in Northwestern Bulgaria.
It is located in Yakimovo Municipality, Montana Province.

See also
List of villages in Montana Province

External links
The Britons who swap the UK for the poorest part of the EU, 12 March 2014, BBC

Villages in Montana Province